Jesse Marcel Sr. (1907 – 1986) was a lieutenant colonel in the United States Air Force who helped administer Operation Crossroads, the 1946 atom bomb tests at the Bikini atoll. He was a key figure in the 1947 Roswell alleged UFO incident, which did not surface again until the late 1970s, when Marcel, now a retired lieutenant colonel, in an interview with ufologist Stanton Friedman, said he believed the debris he retrieved was extraterrestrial.

Early life
Jesse Marcel Sr. was born in 1907, the youngest of seven siblings. Jesse reportedly harbored an early interest in amateur radio and graduated from Terrebonne High School.

After Marcel graduated from high school, he worked for a general store, attended a few graphic design classes at Louisiana State University. Marcel began working as a draftsman and cartographer for the Louisiana Highway Department, the Army Corps of Engineers, and the Shell Oil Company.

Military career
In 1924, Marcel began a three-year enlistment in Louisiana National Guard. In June 1935, Marcel married Viaud Aleen Abrams. The following year she gave birth to their first child. In 1936, Marcel undertook another three-year enlistment, this time in the Texas National Guard.

World War II
In March 1942, Marcel was commissioned as a 2nd lieutenant in the US Army Air Force, and in the summer of 1942, Marcel attended the Army Air Force Intelligence School in Harrisburg, Pennsylvania for training as Combat Photo Interpreter/ Intelligence Officer. Upon graduation from the program, Marcel was promoted to the role of instructor.

In October 1943, 1st Lt. Marcel was assigned to the 5th Bomber Command in the Southwest Pacific, serving as Squadron Intelligence Officer and later Group Intelligence Officer. Marcel received two Air Medals and the Bronze Star. After a promotion to captain, in May 1945, Marcel was promoted to the rank of Major.

509th and role in Operation Crossroads

In the mid-1946, Marcel was attached to the 509th Composite Group  to prepare for and participate in a series of atomic bomb tests in the Pacific called Operation Crossroads at Bikini Atoll.  They were the first detonations of nuclear devices since the atomic bombing of Nagasaki on August 9, 1945.

There were only seven nuclear bombs in existence in July 1946. The two bombs used in the test were Fat Man plutonium implosion-type nuclear weapons of the kind dropped on Nagasaki. The Able bomb was stenciled with the name Gilda and decorated with an Esquire magazine photograph of Rita Hayworth, star of the 1946 movie, Gilda. The Baker bomb was Helen of Bikini.

On 26 July 1946. Brig. General Roger M. Ramey authored a letter of commendation complimenting Marcel's performance during Operation Crossroads.  The following month, Marcel received an additional letter of commendation from Maj. Gen. W. E. Kepner for his performance in the operation.
In December 1947, Marcel received a promotion to the rank of Lt. Colonel.

Roswell UFO Incident
Marcel was a key figure in the discovery and initial analysis of the Roswell UFO incident. "[We] spent a couple of hours Monday afternoon [July 7] looking for any more parts of the weather device", said Marcel. "We found a few more patches of tinfoil and rubber."  In the late 1970s Marcel, by then a retired lieutenant colonel, said he believed the debris he retrieved was extraterrestrial, in an interview with ufologist Stanton Friedman.

Strategic Air Command
Marcel remained with the 509th at Walker AFB until August 16, 1948, when he was transferred to Strategic Air Command at Andrews AFB. When SAC HQ transferred to Offutt AFB in Nebraska on November 9, 1948, Marcel transferred with it.

Final years and death
After requesting a hardship discharge to care for an elderly mother, in July 1950 Marcel returned to Houma, Louisiana.   In September 1950, Marcel was released from active duty and transferred to the Air Force reserves.  He received his final discharge in 1958.

In his final years, Marcel was a self-employed television repairman.

The Roswell incident did not surface again until the late 1970s, when Marcel, now a retired lieutenant colonel, in an interview with ufologist Stanton Friedman, said he believed the debris he retrieved was extraterrestrial. 

Jesse Marcel died in 1986 at the age of 79. He was survived by his wife Viaud Abrams Marcel and his son Jesse A. Marcel Jr. M.D., who, before his own death aged 76 in 2013, spent 35 years claiming on TV and radio shows and in documentaries that, when aged 10 in 1947, his father had shown him alien debris recovered from the Roswell crash site, including, according to his wife Linda, "a small beam with purple-hued hieroglyphics on it".

References

Inline citations

General references

External links
 

1907 births
1986 deaths
Recipients of the Air Medal
United States Army Air Forces personnel of World War II
United States Army Air Forces officers
United States Air Force colonels
Personnel of Strategic Air Command
United States Air Force reservists